The Savoy Prealps (Préalpes de Savoie in French) are a mountain range in the north-western part of the Alps. They are located in Rhône-Alpes (south-eastern France) and, marginally, in Valais (western Switzerland). Savoy Prealps encompass northernmost area of the French Prealps.

Geography 
Administratively the French part of the range belongs to the French departments of Savoie, Haute Savoie and Isère while the Swiss one is divided between the districts of Saint-Maurice and Monthey.
The whole range is drained by the Rhone river.

Summits

The chief summits of the range are:

References

Maps
 French official cartography (Institut Géographique National - IGN); on-line version: www.geoportail.fr
 Swiss official cartography (Swiss Federal Office of Topography - Swisstopo); on-line version: map.geo.admin.ch

Mountain ranges of the Alps
Mountain ranges of Switzerland
Mountain ranges of Auvergne-Rhône-Alpes
Landforms of Valais